Several shipping lines are involved in intermodal freight transport as part of international trade.

List of largest container shipping companies 
This is a list of the 30 largest container shipping companies as of 11 August 2022, according to Alphaliner, ranked in order of the twenty-foot equivalent unit (TEU) capacity of their fleet. In January 2022, MSC overtook Maersk for the container line with the largest shipping capacity for the first time since 1996. Hanjin Shipping was also one of the biggest but it is now defunct.

Notes

See also

 List of largest container ships
 List of busiest container ports
 Jones Act

References

 
Container
de:Containerschiff#Die gr.C3.B6.C3.9Ften Containerschiff-Reedereien der Welt